Jan Filip (born 6 March 1994) is a professional Czech football player who currently plays for FK Varnsdorf.

References

External links
 
 

1994 births
Living people
Czech footballers
Czech Republic youth international footballers
FK Teplice players
FK Varnsdorf players

Association football defenders